Sikkimese may refer to:

 Relating to the Indian state of Sikkim
 Sikkimese language, one of the Southern Tibetic languages
 Sikkimese people, the Indian peoples who inhabit the Indian state of Sikkim
 Native Sikkimese, the indigenous peoples of Sikkim